Alan Vincent Keely (10 May 1982 – 3 May 2021) was an Irish footballer who played as a defender for several League of Ireland teams between 2001 and 2009, including Shelbourne F.C., Finn Harps F.C. and Waterford United F.C. He was a member of the Finn Harps' squad that won the 2004 League of Ireland First Division.

Early life and education 
Keely was born on 10 May 1982 in Dublin, Ireland. The son of former League of Ireland player and manager, Dermot Keely, he attended St. Joseph's CBS and was named as an All-Ireland schoolboy defender.

Keely attended the University of California, Santa Barbara (UCSB) and was a student-athlete on scholarship with the UC Santa Barbara Gauchos men's soccer team. In 2002, his only season with the team, he appeared in 22 games and scored 1 goal with 2 assists. The Gauchos appeared in the 2002 NCAA Division I Men's Soccer Championship, which was the first time the school had participated in the tournament. He was named as the 2002 Big West Conference's Freshman of the Year and was placed on the All-Conference First Team.

Senior career 
Prior to attending UCSB, Keely began his senior career with Shelbourne F.C. in 2001 who were then under the management of his father, Dermot. He made one senior appearance for Shelbourne in 2001–02 season during a League of Ireland Cup match against Shamrock Rovers on 29 October 2001.

Keely left Santa Barbara after his first season, opting to return to Ireland. It was announced in January 2003 that he signed with Kildare County F.C. for the 2003 League of Ireland season. He suffered a serious groin injury mid-season and finished the season with 15 appearances for the club.

Ahead of the 2004 League of Ireland season, Keely joined Dublin City F.C. as a free agent. Unable to crack the first team squad, he was transfer listed, then released, by manager Roddy Collins. Despite interest from Dundalk F.C. manager Jim Gannon, Keely signed with Finn Harps F.C. shortly after. He featured for Finn Harps to close out the season.

With his father Dermot named manager at Dublin City, Keely rejoined the club in November 2004 for the forthcoming 2005 League of Ireland season. He remained with Dublin City through July 2006 when, 17 league games into the season, the club stopped trading and ceased to exist as a football team.

After the club's demise, Waterford United F.C. signed Keely and two of his Dublin City teammates in August 2006. In December 2006, he re-signed for another year with Waterford for the 2007 League of Ireland.

In July 2007, Keely re-joined Shelbourne F.C. He departed the club at the end of the 2009 season. In his three seasons at Shelbourne, Keely made 61 league and cup appearances, and scored one goal.

Later career and death
After his League of Ireland career ended, Keely joined Leinster Senior League side Malahide United F.C. for the 2010 season.

Keely died in May 2021 at the age of 38.

Honours 
Finn Harps
 League of Ireland First Division: 2004

References

External links 
 Shelbourne F.C. player profile (archived)
 Dublin City F.C. player profile (archived)
 ExtraTime.ie player profile
 UC Santa Barbara player profile

2021 deaths
1982 births
Association footballers from County Dublin
League of Ireland players
UC Santa Barbara Gauchos men's soccer players
Shelbourne F.C. players
Waterford F.C. players
Dublin City F.C. players
Finn Harps F.C. players
Kildare County F.C. players
Leinster Senior League (association football) players
Association football defenders
Republic of Ireland association footballers
Malahide United F.C. players
People educated at St. Joseph's CBS, Fairview